Morpheis discreta is a moth in the family Cossidae. It was described by Harrison Gray Dyar Jr. in 1937. It is found in Brazil.

References

Arctiidae genus list at Butterflies and Moths of the World of the Natural History Museum

Zeuzerinae
Moths described in 1937